The Hanford Reach is a free-flowing section of the Columbia River, around  long, in eastern Washington state. It is named after a large northward bend in the river's otherwise southbound course.

Hanford Reach is the only section of the Columbia in the United States that is not tidal nor part of a reservoir, excluding a short reach between the Canada–United States border and the upper end of Franklin D. Roosevelt Lake, the reservoir of Grand Coulee Dam. Much of the Hanford Reach flows through the Hanford Site, a nuclear production facility established during World War II. It is also the site of the Hanford Reach National Monument, created from the original protection area around the Hanford Site. Upstream of the Hanford Reach is Priest Rapids Dam and downstream is the McNary Dam, which also impounds the last stretch of the Snake River, the largest tributary of the Columbia.

The Hanford Reach includes the still extant Coyote Rapids and supports over forty species of fish including significant numbers of spawning fall chinook salmon

See also
Locke Island
Ringold Formation
Savage Island

References

External links

 

Columbia River
Landforms of Benton County, Washington